Morten Schakenda (7 June 1966 – 14 March 2022) was a Norwegian cook, known as one of the leading chefs in the country.

Career
After working on the school ship Gann, he worked at Hotell Ulstein. Later, he was leader of the Gastronomisk institutt in Stavanger for eight years, and made his debut for the national cooking team (1997).  He worked in Oslo restaurants such as Bagatelle, Jans Mat og Vinhus, Terra Restaurant, D'Artagnan and Holmenkollen Restaurant. After three years as the apprentice at Åpent Bakeri, he established a bakery in Lom (2004-). Schakenda had, along with Stein Mortensen and Charles Tjessem, written Med skjell fra gaffelen (2004).

References 

1966 births
2022 deaths
People from Sande, Møre og Romsdal
People from Lom, Norway
Norwegian chefs
Norwegian food writers